Benthophiloides turcomanus is a tiny species of gobiid fish native to the Caspian Sea. The specimens, no longer than  TL, have since been lost.

References

Benthophiloides
Fish of Central Asia
Fish of the Caspian Sea
Fish described in 1941
Endemic fauna of the Caspian Sea